The 10th constituency of Val-de-Marne is a French legislative constituency in the Val-de-Marne département.

Description

The 10th constituency of Val-de-Marne is in the north west of the department bordering Paris to the north. It includes the suburb of Ivry-sur-Seine and the north of Vitry-sur-Seine along with Kremlin-Bicêtre.

Since its creation in 1988 the seat has been solidly left wing and was held by the Communist Party until 2012 when the Left Party (France) candidate withdrew in favour of fellow left wing candidate Jean-Luc Laurent from the second round having come second in the first round of voting. As no other candidate reached required threshold of 12.5% of the registered electorate this left Jean-Luc Laurent as the only candidate in the second round.

Historic Representation

Election results

2022

2017

 
 
 
 
 
 
 
|-
| colspan="8" bgcolor="#E9E9E9"|
|-

2012

 
 
 
 
 
 
|-
| colspan="8" bgcolor="#E9E9E9"|
|-
 
 

 
 
 
 

* Withdrew before the 2nd round

2007

 
 
 
 
 
 
 
|-
| colspan="8" bgcolor="#E9E9E9"|
|-

2002

 
 
 
 
 
 
 
 
|-
| colspan="8" bgcolor="#E9E9E9"|
|-

1997

 
 
 
 
 
 
 
|-
| colspan="8" bgcolor="#E9E9E9"|
|-
 
 

 
 
 
 

* Withdrew before the 2nd round

Sources
Official results of French elections from 2002: "Résultats électoraux officiels en France" (in French).

10